The 2013 Davis Cup (also known as the 2013 Davis Cup by BNP Paribas for sponsorship purposes) was the 102nd edition of the tournament between national teams in men's tennis. Czech Republic successfully held their place as Davis Cup champions, by defeating Serbia in the final, in Belgrade, by a 3–2 score.

The draw took place on 19 September 2012 in London, United Kingdom. Although, the draws for Asia/Oceania Zone Group I and Europe/Africa Zone Group II were held following the remaining play-off ties on 19–21 October 2012.

World Group

Seeds

Draw

Final

World Group play-offs

Date: 13–15 September

The eight losing teams in the World Group first round ties and eight winners of the Zonal Group I final round ties will compete in the World Group play-offs for spots in the 2014 World Group. The draw took place April 11 in London.

Bold indicates team qualified for the 2014 Davis Cup World Group

Seeded teams

 
 
 
 
 
 
 
 

Unseeded teams

 
 
 
 
 
 
 
 

Americas Zone

Group I

Seeds:
 
 

Remaining nations:

Draw

Group II

Seeds:
 
 
 
 

Remaining nations:

Draw

Group III

 
 
  – promoted to Group II in 2014
 
 

 
 
 
  – promoted to Group II in 2014

Asia/Oceania Zone

Group I

Seeds:
 
 
 
 

Remaining nations:

Draw

Group II

Seeds:
 
 
 
 

Remaining nations:

Draw

Group III

 
  – promoted to Group II in 2014
 
 

  – relegated to Group IV in 2014
  – relegated to Group IV in 2014
 
  – promoted to Group II in 2014

Group IV

 
 
 
 
 

 
 
 
  – promoted to Group III in 2014
  – promoted to Group III in 2014

Europe/Africa Zone

Group I

Seeds:
 
 
 
 

Remaining nations:

Draw

Group II

Seeds:
 
 
 
 
 
 
 
 

Remaining nations:

Draw

Group III Europe

 
 
 
 
  – promoted to Group II in 2014
 
 

 
 
 
  – promoted to Group II in 2014

Group III Africa

 
 
 
  – promoted to Group II in 2014
 
 
 

  – promoted to Group II in 2014

References

External links
Official Site

 
D
Davis Cups by year